List of MacGyver episodes, MacGyver (season #), or List of MacGyver episodes (season #) may refer to:
 List of MacGyver (1985 TV series) episodes
 MacGyver (1985 TV series, season 1)
 MacGyver (1985 TV series, season 2)
 MacGyver (1985 TV series, season 3)
 MacGyver (1985 TV series, season 4)
 MacGyver (1985 TV series, season 5)
 MacGyver (1985 TV series, season 6)
 MacGyver (1985 TV series, season 7)
 List of MacGyver (2016 TV series) episodes
 MacGyver (2016 TV series, season 1)
 MacGyver (2016 TV series, season 2)
 MacGyver (2016 TV series, season 3)
 MacGyver (2016 TV series, season 4)
 MacGyver (2016 TV series, season 5)